Simonetta Greggio is an Italian novelist who writes in French.

Biography 
Born on 21 April 1961 in Padova, Italy, Simonetta Greggio moved to Paris, France, in 1981 and has been living there since. Before turning to literature, she contributed as a journalist to several magazines such as City, Télérama, D. La Repubblica and Figaro Madame.

Career
Simonetta Greggio is the author of a dozen books and guides on "art de vivre".

Her first novel, La douceur des hommes, published by Stock in 2005, was voted one of the twenty best books of the year by French magazine Lire.

Her short novela, Etoiles, published by Flammarion in 2006, is translated into six languages including Russian and Korean.

Her second novel, Col de l’Ange, published by Stock in 2007 awaits to be translated.

Bibliography 

Novels:
 2005 : La douceur des hommes, Stock Publishers; 2007, Le Livre de Poche
 2006 : Étoiles, Flammarion Publishers; 2008, Le Livre de Poche
 2007 : Col de l'Ange, Stock
 2008 : Les mains nues, Stock
 2010 : Dolce Vita, Stock
 2011 : L'Odeur du figuier, Flammarion

Other Books:
2001 : La Côte d'Azur des jardins
2005 : Cuisine bio, avec Bonneterre
2006 : Saveurs d'Italie – 40 recettes et astuces

External links

 Stock Publishers website
 Flammarion Publishers website
 RTL Chronique de Bernard Lehut

1961 births
Living people
Writers from Padua
21st-century Italian novelists
Italian women short story writers
Italian writers in French
Italian women writers
French women novelists
21st-century French women writers
21st-century Italian short story writers
21st-century Italian women